Apollonas Vasiliou (born 29 March 1997) is a professional football player who plays as a striker for Omonia Aradippou.

Career
He started his career with AC Omonia, making his first appearance for the senior squad during the 2016–17 season against AEL Limassol.

Club statistics

References

External links

1997 births
Living people
Sportspeople from Nicosia
Cypriot footballers
Cypriot First Division players
AC Omonia players
MEAP Nisou players
Chalkanoras Idaliou players
Association football forwards